Varigence is a software firm headquartered in Greenville, South Carolina, that specializes in the development of business intelligence tools. Varigence is the creator of Business Intelligence Markup Language (Biml).

History

Varigence was founded in 2008 by former Microsoft employee Scott Currie.

In 2009, Varigence released Biml. In October 2011, Varigence held the $10,000 Biml Challenge at the annual PASS Summit in Seattle, Washington. A $10,000 grand prize was given to the person who could complete a business intelligence task the fastest using Biml

References

Business intelligence companies
Companies based in Greenville, South Carolina